Open disc can refer to:

a disk (mathematics) which does not include the circle forming its boundary
the OpenDisc software project